KELT-6, also known as BD+31 2447, is a star in the constellation Coma Berenices. With an apparent magnitude of 10.34, it is impossible to see with the unaided eye, but can be seen with a powerful telescope. The star is located 791 light years away from the Solar System based on parallax, but is drifting away with a radial velocity of 1.62 km/s.

Properties 
KELT-6 is an F-type star that is 13% more massive and 53% larger than the Sun. It radiates at 3.25 times the Sun's luminosity from its photosphere at an effective temperature of 6,727 K. KELT-6 has a projected rotational velocity of 4.53 km/s, and is slightly older than the Sun, with an age of 4.9 billion years. Unlike most hosts, the planet has a poor metallicity, with 52.5% the abundance of heavy metals compared to the Sun.

Planetary System 
In 2013, a long period "hot Jupiter" was discovered orbiting the star using the transit method. Another planet was discovered in 2015 using radial velocity (Doppler spectroscopy) method.

See also 
 List of most luminous stars
 List of most massive stars
 Lists of stars
 Lists of stars by constellation

References 

F-type subgiants
Coma Berenices
Durchmusterung objects
Planetary systems with two confirmed planets